The year 1775 in architecture involved some significant events.

Buildings and structures

Buildings

 Casino at Marino near Dublin, Ireland, designed by William Chambers is completed at about this date.
 Fort Belan commanding the western end of the Menai Strait in Wales completed.
 Midford Castle folly in Somerset, England, built to a design by John Carter.
 Conygar Tower folly in Somerset, England, built to a design by Richard Phelps.
 Bygholm Castle manor house in Denmark built to a design by Andreas Møller.
 Hôtel Grimod de La Reynière town house in Paris built to a design by Jean-Benoît-Vincent Barré.
 The Wick house in Richmond, Surrey, England, built to a design by Robert Mylne.
 Bostock Hall in Cheshire, England, rebuilt, probably to a design by Samuel Wyatt.
 Ingersley Hall in Cheshire, England built about this date.

Births
 May 8 – George Gwilt the younger, English architect (died 1856)
 October 23 – Gottlob Friedrich Thormeyer, German neoclassical architect (died 1842)
 November 23 – Clemens Wenzeslaus Coudray, German architect (died 1845)
 December 17 – Carlo Rossi, Italian-born architect working in Russia (died 1849)

Deaths
 April 30 – Peter Harrison, English-born architect, active in the Rhode Island colony (born 1716)
 December 28 – John Phillips, English master carpenter, builder and architect (born c.1709)

References

Architecture
Years in architecture
18th-century architecture